Khao Sok National Park is in Surat Thani Province, Thailand. Its area is 461,712 rai ~ , and it includes the  Cheow Lan Lake contained by the Ratchaprapha Dam. The park is the largest area of virgin forest in southern Thailand and is a remnant of rain forest which is older and more diverse than the Amazon rain forest.

Geography
Heavy rainfall and falling leaves led to the erosion of the limestone rocks and created the significant karst formations seen today.

Flora
Bamboo holds topsoil very tenaciously, preventing soil erosion on hillsides and riverbanks. With more than 1,500 species, bamboo is the oldest grass in the world, dating back nearly 60 million years. Liana trees grow rapidly wrapping around any vertical or horizontal support base such as takian or "rain trees". Thus, it's dangerous to simply cut a tree in the jungle because it can pull connected liana vines with it creating a cascade of damage. Buttress roots are enlarged root bases mostly of trees that grow above the upper canopy. The theory about these roots is that they either developed in order to be more grounded in storms and rain or that they spread out on the ground in order to get more nutrients.

Many kinds of wild fruit can be found around the national park and serve as sustenance for animals. Among those fruits are wild jackfruit, mangosteen, durian, rambutan, jujube, pomelo, and wild bananas. Wild pepper and ginger are not uncommon. Khao Sok National Park is perhaps most famous for the bua phut (Rafflesia kerrii) flower.

Wildlife
The park is estimated to contain over five percent of the world's species. Wild mammals include Malayan tapir, Asian elephant, tiger, sambar deer, bear, gaur, banteng, serow, wild boar, pig-tailed macaque, langur, white handed gibbons, squirrel, muntjak, mouse deer, and barking deer.

The world's only known amphibious centipede, Scolopendra cataracta, was discovered on a stream bank near the national park in 2001.

Climate
The so-called wet season is between late April–December. The temperature ranges from  all year around. Humidity and warm temperature provide the optimal environment for a rich eco-system in this tropical rain forest.

Natural History
This area is estimated to be over 160 million years old, built through tectonic movements, climate changes, erosions and sediment accumulations. Approximately 300 million years ago, shallow water and warm temperatures in this region led to the creation of a huge coral reef. Estimated to be 5 times as big as the Great Barrier Reef in Australia, it originally stretched from China all the way to Borneo. Due to the collision of the Indian and Eurasian plate 0-66 million years ago, the Himalayas were formed, and what is now Thailand shifted dramatically near the continental divide and the limestone rocks were forced upward creating the dramatic limestone "karsts" for which the region is known today. Finally, melting ice established the river-rich landscape as well as dozens of waterfalls around the national park.

Human History
The first migrants to Thailand migrated during the Ice Age from Borneo around 37,000 BCE. 

The first accounts of people living in Khao Sok were found in the 1800s, during the reign of Rama II. In the Burmese-Siamese of (1809-1812), the Burmese army invaded the western portion of the area, forcing the inhabitants to flee inland. They found the area to be extremely alluring, in beauty, wildlife abundance, and good soil. As news spread of this discovery, more people immigrated to settle the region.

In 1944, the inhabitants of this region were stricken by a deadly epidemic. A large number of the villagers died while the few survivors escaped from the area to settle in nearby Takua Pa.

In 1961, Route 401 was built from Phun Pin in Surat Thani Province to Takua Pa in Phang Nga Province. At the turn of the millennium, they began the process of expanding Route 401 to a 4 lane freeway.

In the 1970s, Thai student activists and communist insurgents set up strongholds in the caves of Khao Sok. Settled in the shelter of the rainforest they protected the region from the Thai army, loggers, miners, and hunters for seven years.

Khao Sok became a national park in 1980. The government and the Electricity Generating Authority of Thailand (EGAT) were interested in this region because Khao Sok holds the largest watershed in southern Thailand.

The dam provides electricity for the south, and the lake became a major holiday destination for Thai and foreign tourists alike. There were several species of animals that had to be resettled to save them from drowning, as the lake slowly filled over a period of 3 years. Unfortunately, a study from 1995 revealed the loss of some 52 species of fish from the river, which could not survive in the stagnant water.

Activities
Khao Sok National Park has various activities for tourists who enjoy activities such as trekking, canoeing, bamboo rafting. A boat tour to Cheow Lan lake is also available.

Trekking: Due to Khao Sok being a tropical rainforest, there are many wild animals such as “wild elephants,  serow, tigers, Malayan sun bears and over 180 bird species to watch”. Those interested in trekking can hire a local guide. Rafflesia Kerrii Meijer can be found in the area. Tourists may stay in the rainforest overnight.

Canoeing and Bamboo rafting: Sok River is known for beautiful views along the river. There are local guides for tourists to hire for canoeing and bamboo rafting tours.

Boat to Cheow Lan lake: Within the deep forest, there are caves to explore such as Diamond cave, Khang Cow Cave and Nam Talu cave which connect to Cheow Lan lake. Tour guides are available to boat visitors from the waterfall to the lake.

Gallery

See also
List of national parks of Thailand
List of Protected Areas Regional Offices of Thailand

References 

 Khao Sok National Park official webpage
 Electricity Generating Authority of Thailand (EGAT)
 Waterfalls and Gibbon Calls; Exploring Khao Sok National Park, Thom Henley, 4th Ed, 2011, Phuket Thailand

External links

The Climate of Thailand
Birdwatching Khao Sok

National parks of Thailand
Protected areas established in 1980
Tenasserim Hills
Geography of Surat Thani province
Tourist attractions in Surat Thani province
1980 establishments in Thailand